Catone in Utica is a 1728 opera by Leonardo Vinci. It was the original setting of Metastasio's libretto of that name.

Recordings
Vinci, Leonardo: Catone in Utica Max Emanuel Cencic (Arbace), Franco Fagioli (Cesare), Valer Sabadus (Marzia), Martin Mitterutzner (Fulvio), Vince Yi (Emilia), Juan Sancho (Catone) Il Pomo D'oro, Riccardo Minasi Decca 3CD 2015

References

1728 operas
Operas by Leonardo Vinci
Operas